Avdiivka or Avdeevka is a city of regional significance in Ukraine's Donetsk Oblast. The city is in the center of the region, just north of the city of Donetsk. The large Avdiivka Coke Plant is located in Avdiivka. 

Avdiivka is within the claimed boundaries of the separatist Donetsk People's Republic, and it has seen heavy fighting as part of the war in Donbas and the 2022 Russian invasion of Ukraine. On 22 February 2023 Governor of Donetsk Oblast Pavlo Kyrylenko declared the city "almost completely destroyed."

On 3 August 2022 only 2,500 people, or 10% of the city's pre-war population, remained in Avdiivka.

History

The presence of nomadic people in the area of Avdiivka dates back to at least the 9th to 13th centuries, as evidenced by a stone sculpture (or baba) that was discovered in a mound.

Avdiivka is one of the oldest settlements in Donetsk region.  The first settlement on the territory of the modern city was founded in the middle of the 18th century by people from the Kursk, Voronezh and Poltava provinces.  In 1778, by order of the Novorossiysk governor, the newly established village became state property. It was named after the name of the first settler, Avdiivka.

According to census data for 1859, 2,299 people (1,180 males and 1,119 females) lived in the state village of Bakhmut District, Katerynoslav Province. There were 450 farmsteads, an Orthodox church and a post office.

As of 1886, 3,087 people lived in the former state village in the center of Avdiiv Volost. There were 555 farm households, an Orthodox church and a school, and 2 fairs were held a year.

In the mid-1880s, the Catherine Railway passed through the area where the city is now located and a railway station was built here.

According to the 1897 census, the number of residents decreased to 2,153 (1,282 males and 871 females), of which 2,057 were of the Orthodox faith.

In 1908, 5,475 people (2,736 males and 2,739 females) lived in the village and there were 865 farm households.

In April 1920, a detachment of the Revolutionary Insurgent Army of Ukraine attacked the Avdiivka railway station, where they destroyed railway property and telephone sets.  In November 1920, Nestor Makhno ordered the detachment of Fyodor Shuss to occupy Avdiivka and the village near it.

Avdiivka suffered as a result of the Holodomor in 1932–1933. The number of established victims in Avdiivka was 485 people.

Russo-Ukrainian War

2014 pro-Russian unrest 

Starting Mid-April 2014 pro-Russian separatists captured several towns in Donetsk Oblast; including Avdiivka. On 21 July 2014, Ukrainian forces reportedly secured the city from separatists. This claim was repeated the next day. Ukrainian forces kept control of Avdiivka, which became a frontline city and frequently shelled. According to the OSCE, the area between Avdiivka and neighboring separatist-controlled Yasynuvata is one of the hotspots of the Russo-Ukrainian War.

In March 2016 the Ukrainian army set up its fortifications in the area's "Industrial Zone", until then a buffer zone between the Donetsk People's Republic controlled territories and government-held territory in the eastern part of Avdiivka. This meant that the pro-Russian separatists no longer had full control of the highway that connected Donetsk and Horlivka (two major cities under their control), and that it became more difficult for them to fire at Avdiivka even with weapons that Minsk II did not prohibit. Since March 2016, fighting for Avdiivka's "Industrial Zone" greatly intensified.

2017 battle 

In 2017, the city was embroiled in a battle from 29 January until 4 February, which left the city without electricity and heating for several days. In January 2017 BBC News estimated that between 16,000 and 22,000 people were living in Avdiivka.

2022 invasion 

As part of the 2022 Russian invasion of Ukraine, Russian forces fired rockets towards Avdiivka, most notably the coke plant in the city. Much of the civilian population has fled due to the battle. On 3 August 2022 Vitalii Barabash, head of the city's military–civilian administration, stated that 2,500 people, or 10% of the city's pre-war population, were still living in Avdiivka. On 22 February 2023 Governor of Donetsk Oblast Pavlo Kyrylenko declared that Avdiivka was almost completely destroyed. As of February 2023, the city remains under Ukrainian control.

Demographics
As of the Ukrainian Census of 2001:

Ethnicity
Ukrainians: 63.5%
Russians: 33.7%
Belarusians: 0.9%
Greeks: 0.6%

Language
Russian: 87.2%
Ukrainian: 12.5%
Belarusian: 0.1%
Armenian: 0.1%

Industry and infrastructure
Local heating energy is normally provided via natural gas from the Avdiivka Coke Plant.  In 2017, the plant was damaged during a bombardment by pro-Russian separatists, leaving the town without heating for several days.

Other than the Avdiivka Coke Plant, the city also has the Avdiivka Factory of Metallic Structures, a quartz sand quarry and a number of other factories and industrial facilities.

The city had its own tramway service which connects the city's center with Avdiivka Coke Plant. Due to the war in Donbas it is no longer operating. The line had three rail stops and the city train station.

The city is conditionally split by a railroad into the old city and the "Khimik" settlement (lit. chemist).

Notable people
 Oleksandr Filippov - footballer

Gallery

References

 
Cities in Donetsk Oblast
Populated places established in the 18th century
Bakhmutsky Uyezd
Cities of regional significance in Ukraine
Populated places established in the Russian Empire
1778 establishments in Ukraine
Pokrovsk Raion